Fantastica is a 2018 Filipino fantasy comedy film directed by Barry Gonzales. It stars an ensemble cast including Vice Ganda, Bela Padilla, Richard Gutierrez, Jaclyn Jose, and Dingdong Dantes. Produced by Star Cinema and Viva Films, the film serves as an official entry to the 2018 Metro Manila Film Festival. The film was released on December 25, 2018. It received mixed reviews from critics, praising the film's special effects but criticizing the lack of character development and some of the comedic scenes.

This also marked the last film appearance of comedian Chokoleit, who died after suffering a fatal heart attack in Bangued, Abra on March 9, 2019, at the age of 48.

Plot
The proprietor of a struggling carnival named Perya Wurtzbach Kleia Blythe was tasked by a princess Sxia Blythe to find three princesses of the knight's land Fantastica. The princesses was warped to Earth separately, where the main cast must track them down to help save Fantastica, but eventually lives regular lives there. But an evil spreads on the knight's land, and his rival Hannah Velax was on their throats. The mission's cover was to revive the carnival/fair to lure the princesses. Also something about portals being opened with 10,000 claughters (clapping and laughter)

Cast

Main cast

Supporting cast

Extended cast

Special participation

Reception

Critical response

Fantastica was released to mixed reviews from critics. Zsarlene B. Chua of BusinessWorld praised the opening sequence by El Gamma Penumbra, fourth wall-breaking jokes and the film's parodies of various drama films, but viewed Vice's continued reliance on insult comedy and innuendos as stale and repetitive, saying "The movie's premise and sheer starpower guarantee the film will be a blockbuster, but if you're expecting something new from Mr. Viceral's yearly MMFF entry, you're bound to be disappointed as it is more of the same: innuendos (which makes one question why it's rated PG) and his usual insult comedy." She did however conclude that "it's a feel-good if mind-numbing film for people who want to shut down and get a few laughs here and there."

John Magbanua of Bandera also gave the film a mixed review, praising the film's special effects and romantic pairings but was critical of the formulaic production and what he noted as censorship done presumably to make the film more family-friendly. Magbanua also noted that Fantastica could have incorporated more carnival elements to further justify the film's narrative.

Box office gross
It was announced by Star Cinema in a thanksgiving dinner organized for Fantastica, that the film became the highest grossing MMFF film which starred Vice Ganda. Fantastica earned  with the figure including earnings from both domestic and international release of the film.

References

External links
 

2018 films
Circus films
Philippine fantasy comedy films
Philippine urban fantasy films
2010s fantasy comedy films
Star Cinema comedy films
Viva Films films
Films set in amusement parks
Filipino-language films